Mecidoba (also, Məçitoba and Medzhidoba) is a village in the Khachmaz Rayon of Azerbaijan.  The village forms part of the municipality of Yataqoba.

References 

Populated places in Khachmaz District